Fuhlsbüttel Nord (Fuhlsbüttel North) is a station on the Hamburg U-Bahn line U1. It was opened in July 1921 and is located in Hamburg, Germany, on the boundaries of the quarters of Fuhlsbüttel and Langenhorn. Both are part of the borough of Hamburg-Nord.

History 
The station was opened in July 1921, after the Langenhorn railway was in preliminary operation with steam trains since 5 January 1918. But in 1918 there was no need for a station in Fuhlsbüttel-Nord, as the vicinity was mainly farmland, and there were only a few buildings at the street of Langenhorner Chaussee. So the station was opened in July 1921, then as Langenhorn Süd (Langenhorn South). In the following years the station was partly used to connect the airport of Hamburg, though being a few miles away from the terminals. Therefore, on 2 October 1934 the station was renamed into Flughafen (Airport). But the airport was better connected with tram line 28, later 9, so on 1 January 1954 the station was renamed again after the street in front of the station into Flughafenstraße. On 5 August 1984 it was renamed again into Fuhlsbüttel Nord to avoid confusion, because a new shuttle service (bus line 110, Airport Express) was established from Ohlsdorf station to the airport.

In 1940 a siding track was built to turn the trains. Today it is used only on rare occasions, as in 1962 a storage siding in Ohlsdorf had been built.

Station layout
The station is elevated with an island platform and two tracks. The station is not accessible for handicapped persons without help, as there is no lift.

Service

Trains
Fuhlsbüttel Nord is served by Hamburg U-Bahn line U1; departures are every 5 minutes, every 10 minutes in non-busy periods. Bus line 172 stops in front of the station, the bus stop of Flughafenstraße 100 metres from the station is served by lines 292, 392, and night bus line 606.

See also

 List of Hamburg U-Bahn stations

References

External links 

 Line and route network plans at hvv.de 

Hamburg U-Bahn stations in Hamburg
U1 (Hamburg U-Bahn) stations
Buildings and structures in Hamburg-Nord
Railway stations in Germany opened in 1921